Communist Workers Party of Turkey is an illegal communist party in Turkey. TKİP was founded in November 1998 by EKİM (October), a group that had split away from the Revolutionary Communist Party of Turkey (TDKP) in 1988. Initially EKİM had been known as Revolutionary Communist Party of Turkey-Leninist Wing (Türkiye Devrimci Komünist Partisi-Leninist Kanat).

In February 1999, TKİP suffered a split, and the Revolutionary People's Movement (DHH) was formed.

TKİP prisoners in Turkish prisons took part in the death fasts in 2000.

TKİP publishes Ekim (October), Kızıl Bayrak (Red Flag), Ekim Gençliği (October Youth) and Kamu Emekçileri Bülteni (workers' bulletin).

See also
List of illegal political parties in Turkey
Communist Party of Turkey (disambiguation), for other groups using similar names

References

External links
TKİP website
Kizil Bayrak Gazetesi
Kizil Bayrak günlük sitesi

Communist parties in Turkey
Political parties established in 1998
Clandestine groups
1998 establishments in Turkey
Banned political parties in Turkey
Banned communist parties